Benjamin Independent School District is a public school district based in Benjamin, Texas (USA).

Finances
In the 2010–2011 school year, the appraised valuation of property in the district was $27,477,000. The maintenance tax rate was $0.117 and the bond tax rate was $0.000 per $100 of appraised valuation.

Academic achievement
In 2011, the school district was rated "recognized" by the Texas Education Agency.

Schools
In the 2011–2012 school year, the district had one school (Benjamin School) that served students in grades pre-kindergarten through twelve.

See also

List of school districts in Texas

References

External links

School districts in Knox County, Texas